Gutterson Fieldhouse (nicknamed "The Gut") is a 4,035-seat hockey arena in Burlington, Vermont. It is home to the Vermont Catamounts men's and women's ice hockey teams.  It is the largest indoor arena in the state of Vermont.  It is adjacent to Patrick Gymnasium at the school's athletic complex. It is named for Albert Gutterson, class of 1912, the school's first Olympian. He set an Olympic record with a 7.60 meter long jump, beating, among others, the great Jim Thorpe.

History
The barrel-vaulted arena opened in 1963, originally seating 3,335. It was expanded to its current capacity in 1990. The hockey team has played host to exhibitions with the Soviet Union national ice hockey team, Russia women's national ice hockey team, and United States men's national ice hockey team and United States women's national ice hockey team. It was the venue for the first women's hockey game ever nationally televised in the US (on December 17, 1997, a pre-Olympic game between Canada and the United States). Between 1995 and 2000, and again in 2002, it was the preseason training camp site of the New York Rangers. (The Hartford Whalers had previously held their 1992 and 1993 training camps there.)

On March 30, 2012, President Barack Obama made his first public appearance in the State of Vermont at the Gutterson Fieldhouse. However, he did speak previously to students on campus at UVM campaigning for Senator Bernie Sanders (I-VT) in 2006, outside of Ira Allen Chapel.

The Vermont Principal's Association (VPA) has held the boys' and girls' high school state ice hockey championships at the venue since 1976 (boys) and 2011 (girls).

Gutterson Fieldhouse, along with Cairns Arena in nearby South Burlington, served as venues for the 2012 IIHF Women's World Championship.

In July 2016, the Vermont Bucks, an indoor football team, was announced as a 2017 expansion team as part of American Indoor Football (AIF) and would use the arena for home games. The AIF would fold before the Bucks could play in the league, but team owner Tim Viens started the Can-Am Indoor Football League for the 2017 season. The Can-Am then merged into the American Arena League after one season of play, but Viens sold the Bucks and the Bucks would eventually fold before playing in the new league.

References

External links
Gutterson Fieldhouse at UVM Athletics
Albert's Gold - More information on the Gutterson Field House

College ice hockey venues in the United States
Indoor ice hockey venues in the United States
Sports venues in Vermont
Buildings and structures in Burlington, Vermont
Tourist attractions in Burlington, Vermont
Sports in Burlington, Vermont
Indoor arenas in Vermont
Music Venues in Vermont
Sports venues completed in 1963
1960s establishments in Vermont
1963 establishments in the United States